Vaucluse is an electoral district of the Legislative Assembly in the Australian state of New South Wales, based on the suburb of Vaucluse. Vaucluse is one of two original (post 1927 redistribution) electorates to have never been held by the opposing  party and always by the Liberal Party or its predecessors, the other district being Hornsby. It has been represented in the past by former Leaders of the Opposition Murray Robson and Peter Debnam of the Liberal Party.

Members for Vaucluse

Election results

References

External links

Vaucluse